Chachalacas are galliform birds from the genus Ortalis. These birds are found in wooded habitats in the far southern United States (Texas), Mexico, and Central and South America. They are social, can be very noisy and often remain fairly common even near humans, as their relatively small size makes them less desirable to hunters than their larger relatives. As agricultural pests, they have a ravenous appetite for tomatoes, melons, beans, and radishes and can ravage a small garden in short order. They travel in packs of six to twelve.  They somewhat resemble the guans, and the two have commonly been placed in a subfamily together, though the chachalacas are probably closer to the curassows.

Taxonomy
The genus Ortalis was introduced (as Ortalida) by the German naturalist Blasius Merrem in 1786 with the little chachalaca (Ortalis motmot) as the type species. The generic name is derived from the Ancient Greek word όρταλις, meaning "pullet" or "domestic hen." The common name derives from the Nahuatl verb chachalaca, meaning "to chatter." With a glottal stop at the end, chachalacah was an alternate name for the bird known as the chachalahtli. All these words likely arose as an onomatopoeia for the four-noted cackle of the plain chachalaca (O. vetula). The genus contains 16 species.

Mitochondrial and nuclear DNA sequence data tentatively suggest that the chachalacas emerged as a distinct lineage during the Oligocene, somewhere around 40–20 mya, possibly being the first lineage of modern cracids to evolve; this does agree with the known fossil record – including indeterminate, cracid-like birds – which very cautiously favors a north-to-south expansion of the family.

Species

Prehistoric species
The cracids have a very poor fossil record, essentially being limited to a few chachalacas. The prehistoric species of the present genus, however, indicate that chachalacas most likely evolved in North or northern Central America:

 Ortalis tantala (Early Miocene of Nebraska, USA)
 Ortalis pollicaris (Flint Hill Middle Miocene of South Dakota, USA)
 Ortalis affinis (Ogallala Early Pliocene of Trego County, Kansas, USA)
 Ortalis phengites (Snake Creek Early Pliocene of Sioux County, Nebraska, USA)

The Early Miocene fossil Boreortalis from Florida is also a chachalaca; it may actually be referrable to the extant genus.

References

External links